Conus brunneus, common name Wood's brown cone, is a species of sea snail, a marine gastropod mollusk in the family Conidae, the cone snails and their allies.

Like all species within the genus Conus, these snails are predatory and venomous. They are capable of "stinging" humans; therefore, live ones should be handled carefully or not at all.

Description
The size of the shell varies between 16 mm and 65 mm. The short spire is conical and tuberculate. The color of the shell is chestnut-brown, lineated with chocolate, with sometimes longitudinal white maculations forming a broad central interrupted band, and a few additional maculations on other portions of the surface. The base of the shell is subgranularly striate.

Distribution
This species occurs in the Pacific Ocean off Southwest Baja California, Mexico to Ecuador; and off the Galápagos Islands.

References

 Tucker J.K. & Tenorio M.J. (2013) Illustrated catalog of the living cone shells. 517 pp. Wellington, Florida: MdM Publishing.
 Puillandre N., Duda T.F., Meyer C., Olivera B.M. & Bouchet P. (2015). One, four or 100 genera? A new classification of the cone snails. Journal of Molluscan Studies. 81: 1–23

External links
 The Conus Biodiversity website
 Cone Shells – Knights of the Sea
 

brunneus
Gastropods described in 1828